Harry Aveling (born 1942 in Sydney) is an Australian scholar, translator and teacher. He specialises in Indonesian and Malaysian literature, and Translation Studies. He received the degrees of Doctor of Philosophy in Malay Studies from the National University of Singapore and Doctor of Creative Arts (DCA) from the University of Technology, Sydney.  Besides his academic writing, he has translated extensively from Indonesian and Malay, from Vietnamese Francophone literature, and also co-translated from Hindi. He has been awarded the Anugerah Pengembangan Sastra (Literature Development Award) for his translation work.  Aveling has two sons, a daughter and five granddaughters.

In the early 1960s Aveling began studying Indonesian and Malay. He lived in Malaysia for three years of "total immersion" during the 1970s. He later described this as a time when the Malaysian government was in desperate need for foreign professors to teach in their newly revitalised education system; Malay teachers during the period were earning doctorates abroad. By this time he had already translated several volumes.

Aveling has held the rank of adjunct professor of Southeast Asian Literature at Ohio University since 2002. In  2001 Ohio University Press published his study of Indonesian poetry during the New Order under President Suharto, which outlined the development of the medium in its socio-historical context. Writing for The Jakarta Post, Lie Hua noted that it was perhaps the first such study but that it had several mistranslations. By this time he had translated more than 50 volumes of Indonesian and Malay literature. In 2006 he served as visiting professor of Translation Studies at the Faculty of Humanities, University of Indonesia.

Aveling was a Member of the Doctoral Studies Committee for the Faculty of English Linguistics and Literature, University of Social Sciences and Humanities, Ho Chi Minh City, Vietnam, and taught there in 2008 and 2009. In late 2010, he taught in the Graduate School of Gadjah Mada University, Yogyakarta, Indonesia.
He is a Fellow of the Stockholm Collegium for World Literary History, Stockholm University, representing island Southeast Asia. He was President of the Australian Association for Literary Translation, 2005–2008, and is currently Immediate Past President of the Malaysia and Singapore Society, a regional subgroup of the Asian Studies Association of Australia.

He currently holds Adjunct Full Professorships in the Faculty of Humanities and Social Sciences, La Trobe University and the School of Literatures, Languages, Cultures and Linguistics, Monash University, both in Melbourne, Australia. In Fall 2014 he was visiting professor of English in Creative Writing at the University of Maryland, College Park.

In Nov, 2015, Dr Aveling returned to the University of Social Sciences and Humanities, Ho Chi Minh City, Vietnam as a visiting professor to teach the course "Translation Studies" for Vietnamese MA students by the invitation of the Faculty of English Linguistics and Literature.

In 2019 Dr Aveling was shortlisted for the NSW Premier's Literary Awards Translation Prize.

Publications

Harry Aveling / Peter Friedlander (trans)/ 
Harry Aveling (trans)/ 
Harry Aveling (trans)/ 
Harry Aveling / Razif Bahari (trans)/ 
Harry Aveling (trans)/ 
Harry Aveling (trans)/ 
Harry Aveling (trans)/ 
Harry Aveling / 
Harry Aveling (trans)/ 
Harry Aveling (trans)/ 
Harry Aveling (trans) / 
Harry Aveling (trans)/ 
Harry Aveling (trans) / 
Harry Aveling / 
Harry Aveling (trans) / 
Harry Aveling / 
Harry Aveling 
Harry Aveling 
Harry Aveling (trans) / 
Harry Aveling / Linda Owens(trans) / 
Harry Aveling(ed and trans) / 
Harry Aveling (trans) / 
Harry Aveling / Sudha Joshi(trans) / 
Harry Aveling / Sudha Joshi(trans) / 
Harry Aveling (trans) /

References

1942 births
Australian translators
Indonesian–English translators
Living people
People from Sydney
University of Technology Sydney alumni